Carlos Alberto Utrilla Cruz (born 27 December 1994) is a Mexican professional footballer who plays as a forward-

Career
Born in Centro Municipality, Tabasco, Utrilla began playing football with Tigres UANL's and Chiapas F.C.'s youth teams before joining Chiapas' Segunda División (third-level) affiliate Atlético Chiapas. He made his professional debut with Cafetaleros de Tapachula while on a six-month loan from Chiapas.

References

External links
 

1994 births
Living people
Footballers from Tabasco
Association football forwards
Chiapas F.C. footballers
Cafetaleros de Chiapas footballers
Mexican footballers